The Hebrew Bible is the canonical collection of Hebrew scriptures and is the textual source for the Christian Old Testament. In addition to religious instruction, the collection chronicles a series of events that explain the origins and travels of the Hebrew peoples in the ancient Near East. The historicity of the collection of scriptures is a source of ongoing debate.

The events of the Hebrew Bible can be subdivided into 3 main sections: the Torah (instruction), the Nevi'im (prophets), and the Ketuvim (writings).

The events listed in the Torah start with the creation of the universe and conclude with transfer of authority from Moses to Joshua and the death of Moses.

The Nevi'im is authored by leading Hebrew prophets from the time Joshua leads the Hebrew people into Canaan until some time after the return of Hebrew remnant from Babylonian exile. In addition to recorded significant contemporary military and political events, many future events are predicted.

The Ketuvim recounts events over the same timeline as the Nevi'im, but from the point of view of secular leaders and lesser prophets.

Torah

Genesis
 Genesis creation narrative
 Adam and Eve
 Fall of man
 Cain and Abel
 Generations of Adam
 Nephilim
 Genesis flood narrative
 Noah's Covenant
 Curse of Ham
 Generations of Noah
 Tower of Babel
 Abram's migration
 A wife confused for a sister (featuring Abraham, Sarah, and Pharaoh, as characters)
 Abraham and Lot's conflict
 Chedorlaomer
 Abraham and Melchizedek
 Covenant of the pieces
 Hagar
 The first circumcision
 Sodom and Gomorrah
 Lot's drunkenness
 Cave of the Patriarchs
 A wife confused for a sister (featuring Abraham, Sarah, and Abimelech, as characters)
 Keturah's sons
 Isaac and Rebecca
 Binding of Isaac
 A wife confused for a sister (featuring Isaac, Rebekah, and Abimelech, as characters)
 Jacob and Esau
 The blessing of Isaac
 Jacob's Ladder
 Jacob and Rachel/The sheep and the stone
 Rachel and Leah
 Jacob's children

 Jacob's gifts to Esau
 Jacob's reconciliation with Esau
 Jacob wrestling with the angel
 Rape of Dinah

 Joseph enslaved
 Tamar and Judah
 Potiphar's wife

 Blessing of Jacob

Exodus

 The Finding of Moses
 The Burning Bush

 Zipporah at the inn
 Let my people go
 Bricks without straw
 With a strong hand and an outstretched arm
 Aaron's rod becomes a serpent
 The Plagues of Egypt
 The Passover
 The Exodus
 Passage of the Red Sea
 The Song of the sea
 Massah U-Meribah
 Amalek
 Jethro

 The Ten Commandments (first set)
 The Covenant Code
 The Golden Calf
 The Ten Commandments (second set)
 Construction of the Tabernacle (Exodus 35-40)

Leviticus

 The Priestly Code
 The Holiness Code
 The Ordination of Aaron and His Sons
 The Death of Nadab and Abihu (Leviticus 10:1-20)
 A Blasphemer Stoned (Leviticus 24:10-23)

Numbers

 Snow-white Miriam
 The report of the spies

 Aaron's rod sprouts and bears fruit
 Waters of Meribah

 Lifting up of the brass serpent (Nehushtan)

 Balaam and the Donkey
 The Heresy of Peor

 The War against the Midianites.
 Machir, Reuben, and Gad, in Gilead and Jazeer

Deuteronomy
 Moses Begins to Retell Wilderness Stories, Deuteronomy 1-3
 The Deuteronomic Code
 The Song of Moses, Deuteronomy 32
 The Blessing of Moses, Deuteronomy 33
 The Death of Moses, Deuteronomy 34

Nevi'im

Joshua
 Charge from God to Joshua. Joshua takes charge, Joshua 1:1-18
 Rahab and the Spies
 The Fall of Jericho
 The Sun Stands Still

Judges
 Judges 1: Israelite tribes attempt to conquer Canaanite cities
 Israel Disobeys God,    2:1-23
 Othniel 

 Othniel's Campaign as Judge, 3:7-11

 Ehud 

 Ehud gains the victory over Moabite King Eglon 3:12-30

 Shamgar 

 Deborah 

 Deborah,    4:1-24
 The Song of Deborah,    5:1-31

 Gideon 

 The Lord Appears to Gideon,    6:1-40
 The Sign of the Fleece and Gideon's Three Hundred, 7:1-25
 Midian Subdued, 8:1-35

 Abimelech 

 Abmilech, son of Gideon (Jerubbaal) made king at Shechem after destroying his own family, 9:1-6
 Jotham, the lone survivor and brother, tells The Parable of the Trees. He speaks against Abimelech then flees, 9:7-21
 Shechem betrays Abimelech. He attacks and destroys the city.
 Abimelech captures the town of Thebez, but he is mortally wounded by a woman. 9:22-57

 Tola 

Tola the son of Puah, the son of Dodo, a man of Issachar dwelt in Shamir in mount Ephraim. He judged Israel for twenty-three years, 10:1,2

 Jair 

 Jephthah 

 Jephthah and His Vow,    11: 1-40

 Ibzah 

12:8-10

 Elon 

12:11, 12

 Abdon 

12:13-15

 Samson 

 The Birth of Samson,    13:1-25
 Samson's Phlistine Wife,    14:1-20
 The Philistine's Defeated,    15: 1-20
 Samson and Delilah,    16:1-31
 The Death of Samson,    17:1-13

 Other Stories 

 Micah's Idolatry, 18:1–31
 Levite's concubine, gang rape at Gibeah, 19:1–30
 Benjamite War: Battle of Gibeah, 20:1–48
 Abduction of the women of Jabesh Gilead and Shiloh, 21:1–25

1 & 2 Samuel

 Hannah and the Birth of Samuel
 David and Goliath
 David and Jonathan
 David and Bathsheba
 Absalom's Conspiracy

1 & 2 Kings

 The Wisdom of Solomon
 Solomon builds the Temple
 The Queen of Sheba
 Elijah on Mount Carmel
 Elijah Taken up to Heaven

 The Healing of Naaman
 Hezekiah

Isaiah

Jeremiah
 Call of Jeremiah, 1:1-10
 Jeremiah sees an almond rod then a boiling pot, 1:11-19
 Jeremiah's message at the temple gate, 7:1-34
 Jeremiah buys a linen waistband and puts it in the crevice of a rock near the Euphrates. 13:1-11
 The LORD tells Jeremiah that he can't get married or have children, 16:1-21
 Jeremiah stands at the city gate proclaiming the Sabbath's importance 17:19-27
 Jeremiah visits the potter, 18:1-23
 Jeremiah takes a potter's clay jar and some of the elders to the valley of Ben-hinnon, 19:1-15
 Pashur, the chief officer in the house of the LORD, beats Jeremiah and puts him in stocks. Jeremiah's complains to God. 20:1-18
 Zedekiah, Pashur, and Zephaniah ask Jeremiah if there is a positive message from the LORD. Jeremiah prophesies doom for them. He predicts the coming of the Branch.  21:1-23:40
 Jeremiah summarizes 23 years of prophetic ministry; lists the nations under judgment and predicts 70 years of captivity. 25:1-38
 Jeremiah prophesies against the temple and the city. He is accused of a capital crime. His life is spared after discussion of precedence. Thanks to Ahikam the son of Shaphan. 26:1-24
 Following the LORD's directive, Jeremiah puts himself in bonds and a yoke. He relates that the LORD has given Nebuchadnezzar the land until his time comes. Hananiah breaks Jeremiah's yoke and prophesies the opposite message. 27:1-22
 The Exile

Ezekiel

Hosea

Hosea was a prophet who lived and prophesied just before the destruction of Israel in 722 BC. He preached to the northern kingdom. Throughout the book you will see that he refers to Israel and Ephraim. Ephraim was the largest tribe in Israel and sometimes the whole nation was referred to as Ephraim.

Joel

Amos

Obadiah

Jonah
 Jonah and the Fish

Micah

Nahum

Habakkuk

Zephaniah

Haggai

Zechariah

Malachi

Ketuvim

Psalms

Proverbs

Job

Song of Songs

Ruth
 Boaz and Ruth

Lamentations

Ecclesiastes

Esther
 Esther and Mordechai

Daniel
 Nebuchadnezzar's Dream
 Daniel in the lions' den
 The Fiery Furnace
 The writing on the wall

Ezra/Nehemiah
 The Return to Jerusalem
 The Building of the Second Temple

Chronicles (I & II)

See also
 Hebrew Bible
 List of New Testament stories

References

External links
 Great Stories of the Bible - an index of bible stories in the Hebrew Bible (Old Testament)

Hebrew Bible content
Old Testament-related lists
Hebrew Bible events

he:סיפורים ומשלים מן המקרא